Dahima is a village in Hissar-1 Tehsil, Hisar district, Haryana, India. Its Pin code is 125006.

Demographics
As of 2011 India census, Dahima (Hisar) had a population of 2273 in 442 households. Males (1205) constitute 53.01%  of the population and females (1068) 46.98%. Dahima has an average literacy (1429) rate of 62.86%, less than the national average of 74%: male literacy (853) is 59.69%, and female literacy (576) is 40.3% of total literates (1429). In Dahima (Hisar) 13.28% of the population is under 6 years of age (302).
The main families of this village are CHAMAR's . People of dahima mostly belongs to Dhania & singhania's clan.

Adjacent villages
 Dabra, Hisar
 Mirkan, Hisar
 Bhojraj
 Balawas
 Nalwa
 Khanak, Bhiwani
 Gunjar
 Kanwari
 Ladwa, Hisar
 Saharwa
 Kutiya
Dhamana

References

Villages in Hisar district